Snooker is a cue sport, that is played on a green baize-covered table with pockets in each of the four corners and in the middle of each of the long side cushions.

Snooker may also refer to:

Sport 
Six-red snooker
Snooker plus, a cue sport based on snooker
Power Snooker, a 2010 variant of the cue sport snooker
American Snooker, a variation with simplified rules
Tenball, a version of Snooker with additional rules made for television - presented by Phillip Schofield
Snooker Shoot Out, a variant of Snooker based on Shot clock rules

Games
Jimmy White's 'Whirlwind' Snooker, a 1991 computer game
Snooker (video game), a 1983 sports simulation video game
Snooker 19, a 2019 sports simulation video game

People
Morrie Arnovich or "Snooker" (1910–1959), American baseball player
Mr. Snooker (Joe Davis; 1901–1978), English professional player of snooker and English billiards

Songs
"Snooker Loopy", a humorous 1986 song by Chas & Dave
"Snookeroo", an Elton John song from the 1974 Ringo Starr album Goodnight Vienna

Movies
Hagiga B'Snuker, a 1975 Israeli film originally named Snooker

See also
 Snookered, a term used in cue sports to describe a scenario where one's ball cannot be directly hit with the cue ball without causing a foul